Gordon Brothers Group, which has its headquarters in Boston, Massachusetts, is a liquidation and restructuring firm that was founded in 1903 by Jacob Gordon.

Notable liquidations
CompUSA
G.I. Joe's
KB Toys
Linens 'n Things
Music World
The Sharper Image
Anchor Blue Clothing Company (60 locations)
Hollywood Video/Movie Gallery/GameCrazy
Borders Group
Syms

Notable restructurings

Laura Ashley plc
Polaroid brand, acquired in 2009 with Hilco and sold 2017

References

External links
 

Companies based in Boston
American companies established in 1903
Financial services companies established in 1903
1903 establishments in Massachusetts